Hanlyo University is a university located in Gwangyang, South Korea. It was established in 1993.

References

External links
Hanlyo University 

Private universities and colleges in South Korea
Universities and colleges in South Jeolla Province
Educational institutions established in 1995
1995 establishments in South Korea